Mobin Rai (born 27 December 1993) is an Indian footballer who plays as a defender for United Sikkim in the I-League.

Career statistics

Club
Statistics accurate as of 13 April 2013

References

Indian footballers
1993 births
Living people
Footballers from Sikkim
Indian Gorkhas
I-League players
United Sikkim F.C. players
Association football defenders